Waleed Shabazz (born August 3, 1975), better known by his stage name C-Rayz Walz, is an American rapper from the Bronx, New York. He has been a member of the collective Stronghold.

Early life
Waleed Shabazz was born and raised in the Bronx, New York. His father was a drug kingpin. When he was 2 years old, his father was murdered.

He grew up listening to DJ Kool Herc, who is credited with originating hip hop music. In this environment, he developed a love of music and began freestyling with his friends for fun. In school, he had rap battles in the lunch room with his childhood friend Prodigy.

Career
In 2003, C-Rayz Walz released a studio album, Ravipops (The Substance), on Definitive Jux. In 2005, he released another studio album, Year of the Beast, on the label. In 2007, he released a collaborative studio album with Sharkey, titled Monster Maker, on Babygrande Records.

Personal life
Waleed Shabazz is currently incarcerated, having plead guilty to assault and kidnapping on January 30, 2023. The plea entered also covers the charges of rape, child endangerment, and 28 other charges.

Discography

Studio albums
 The Prelude (1999)
 Detonator Records Volume 1 (2001) 
 Off the Radar (2003)
 Limelight (The Outroduction) (2003)
 Ravipops (The Substance) (2003)
 Year of the Beast (2005)
 1975: Return of the Beast (2006)
 The Best of the Beast (2006)
 The Dropping (2006)
 Monster Maker (2007) 
 Chorus Rhyme (2007) 
 Freestyle vs. Written (2008) 
 Almighty: Original S.I.N. (2008) 
 Who the F%@k Are You? (2009)
 Naptown: The Broken Comb (2010)
 All Blvck Everything: The Prelude (2011)
 Year of the Beatnikz (2011)
 The Code (2012)
 The Calendar (2012)
 St. Patrick Rayz: The Leper-Con (2013)
 Almighty: The Solar Facts (2013)
 Feel Me (2014)

Compilation albums
 Singular Plurals (2002)
 Singular Plurals Vol. 2 (2005)
 Free Rayz Walz (2008)
 Beat the System (2010)
 Where the Walz Things Are (2010)
 I Am Numba Four (2011)

EPs
 We Live: The Black Samurai (2004)

Singles
 "Pots and Pans" (2001)
 "It's a Wrap" / "Peroxide" (2002)
 "The Essence" (2003)
 "Buck 80" / "Body You" (2003)
 "We Live" / "Protect My Family" (2004)
 "R'Thentic" / "Street Reppin'" (2005)
 "Dead Flowers" (2009)
 "Linsanity" (2012)

Guest appearances
 Aesop Rock - "Bent Life" from Labor Days (2001)
 Cannibal Ox - "Battle for Asgard" from The Cold Vein (2001)
 El-P - "Blood" from Fantastic Damage (2002)
 Dutchmassive - "The Hook" from Junk Planet (2004)
 Chase Phoenix - "Say Something" from Cut to the Chase (2004)
 Dub Sonata - "New York" from On the Arm (2007)
 Gumz - "Hip Hop Music" from From Fetus to Genius (2007)
 Socalled - "You Are Never Alone" from Ghettoblaster (2007)
 DJ I-Dee - "Explosion" from Solitude (2008)
 Sadat X - "Gamer" from Brand New Bein' (2009)
 Time - "Paraghnoid" from Naked Dinner (2009)
 MC Paul Barman - "The Moon" from Thought Balloon Mushroom Cloud (2009)
 Access Immortal - "I Love New York" from Birth of a Dream (2010)
 DJ Lord Ron - "Concrete Bars (Echo Park Beat Street N2 Da Future)" and "It'z Da R.C.P." from Environmental Shape Sounds of DJ Lord Ron (2010)
 Irealz - "Starz of the Godz" from The Code of Omerta (2011)
 Verse Essential - "Between the Lines" from Ingenious: Deluxe Edition (2011)
 Intention - "Blvck Pioneer" from American Psycho (2012)
 Bedlam Brethren - "Apocalypto" from Black Feather Messengers (2012)
 Falcon Burns & Melph - "The Cypher" from Back in Effect: The Word Effect Chapter II (2012)
 Apaulo Treed & Knightstalker - "Contraband" from The Last Line of Defence (2013)
 Junclassic - "My Style (Remix)" from Blvd Backdrop (2013)
 Cannibal Ox - "Street Reppin" and "That Moment Before Crazy" from Gotham (2013)
 Plot - "I Feel Dirty" from Towny Fresh (2014)
 Scholars Ent. - "When It Was Real" from Maintenance Vol. 1 (2015)
 Obi Khan - "The Circus" from Grhyme... Thee EP (2018)
 Kyo Itachi & Realio Sparkzwell - "Enemy of the State" from Akira (2018)

References

External links
 Official website (archive)
 

1979 births
Living people
African-American male rappers
Underground rappers
Rappers from the Bronx
Definitive Jux artists
21st-century American rappers
21st-century American male musicians
21st-century African-American musicians
20th-century African-American people